Sergius III  may refer to:

Pope Sergius III (reigned 897 and 911), Italian-born pope
Sergius III of Naples, duke in the 990s
Sergius III of Amalfi, duke in 1031–1073